Judith M. "Judy" Burnfield is the director of the Institute for Rehabilitative Science and Engineering, director of the Movement and Neurosciences Center, and the Clifton Chair in Physical Therapy and Movement Sciences at Madonna Rehabilitation Hospital in Lincoln, Nebraska.

Burnfield earned her Doctor of Philosophy degree from the University of Southern California and completed her postdoctoral training at the Pathokinesiology Laboratory at Rancho Los Amigos National Rehabilitation Center.  She was appointed director of the newly designed Athletic Performance Laboratory at the University of Nebraska–Lincoln from 2013 to 2015.
https://www.madonna.org/research/judith-burnfield

References

Living people
Creighton University faculty
American physiotherapists
University at Buffalo alumni
University of Nebraska–Lincoln faculty
University of South Dakota faculty
University of Southern California alumni
Year of birth missing (living people)
American women academics
21st-century American women